The Union of Grodno established a real union between the Grand Duchy of Lithuania and the Duchy of Livonia on 25 December 1566, during the Livonian War. Livonia had submitted itself to Sigismund II Augustus by the Treaty of Vilnius (1561). Livonia's administrative division was re-organized with its castellans becoming members of the Lithuanian senate. The union did not impact Livonian jurisdiction, which was to be carried out according to its traditional customs.

Sources

Livonian War
1566 treaties
Treaties of the Grand Duchy of Lithuania
Treaties of the Duchy of Livonia
1566 in Lithuania